The Scarlet Lady AKA The Bitch Wants Blood is a 1969 French/Italian comedy film directed by Jean Valère and starring Monica Vitti, Maurice Ronet, and Robert Hossein. Written by Paul Gégauff and Jean Valère, the film is about a beautiful Italian businesswoman who, after being swindled out of her fortune by her boyfriend, travels to Paris to kill him before killing herself.

Plot
A beautiful Italian businesswoman, Lucille Lombardi (Monica Vitti), discovers that her boyfriend and marketing director, Julien Auchard (Robert Hossein), has bankrupted her family business, cheated her out of her wealth, and left her penniless. Shocked by the betrayal, the loss of her villa in Nice, and feeling that all is lost, Lucille decides to sell her jewelry and binge on champagne and caviar before committing suicide. Her binge renders her intoxicated and leaves her daydreaming about revenge. At first she plans to leave François a note blaming him for her death, but realizing it would have little effect on him, she decides that revenge is the only course—that she must kill Julien before ending her own life. Knowing that Julien travels to Paris every Friday, Lucille decides to hold off on suicide for one week until she has a chance to kill the man who ruined her life.

After arriving in Paris, Lucille buys an Austin Princess luxury car and sets about planning her revenge while continuing her lavish spending on designer clothing and food. Uncomfortable being alone, she invites a stranger named François (Maurice Ronet), a marine salvage expert, to have a romantic lunch with her at the Eiffel Tower. When Lucille reveals her intentions to end her life later that week, François shows genuine concern for her and states that he will not allow it—that he'll not leave her side. Lucille manages to elude him after lunch and he is unable to follow. In the coming days, François desperately tries to locate her as she continues her spending spree on fine clothes and expensive food and champagne while waiting for her ex-boyfriend to arrive in Paris.

While posing as a Swiss journalist, Lucille becomes entangled with a New York News correspondent named John Bert (Claudio Brook), a shady Spaniard named Alberto de Villalonga (Albert Simono), and the drug-addled manager, Tom Sturges (Gérard Lartigau), of an English rock group named The Timothys who just appeared at London's Royal Albert Hall. She goes on a series of dates, continuing her extravagant spending during her final days. Meanwhile, François continues his desperate search for the woman he believes will kill herself on Friday. After receiving no help from the police, he tracks down all the Austin Princess owners in Paris, thinking it will lead him to Lucille. Despairing on not finding her, he resigns himself to his work, which involves a lucrative new salvage operation in Venezuela that will make him wealthy (from the shady Spaniard Alberto as it turns out).

On Thursday night, Lucille wanders the streets of Paris alone. A man approaches her, mistaking her for a prostitute, and she goes back to his place to have sex, later giving away the 300 francs she was paid. On Friday, Lucille meets Julien at the Paris-Orly Airport pretending she has a wealthy investor who can buy back the company that Julien now owns. Interested in the deal, Julien accompanies her to her hotel room where she pulls her gun, demanding that she accompany him to his appointment in Chantilly. Intending to kill them both in an auto accident, Lucille has second thoughts just as they are about to crash into an electrical pole. "You disgust me so much that it will save your life," she tells him, as she leaves at the roadside and drives away.

Back in Paris, François spots Lucille's Austin Princess by chance and follows her to the Eiffel Tower, where she intends to end her life. At the top, Lucille considers jumping, but something prevents her. When François arrives at the top, he finds her eating dessert in the restaurant where they enjoyed their romantic lunch, and they smile at each other.

Cast
 Monica Vitti as Lucille Lombardi
 Maurice Ronet as François, the marine salvage expert
 Robert Hossein as Julien Auchard, the boyfriend
 Claudio Brook as John Bert, New York News correspondent
 Albert Simono as Alberto de Villalonga
 Lucien Raimbourg
 Monique Mélinand
 Simone Bach
 Robert Rollis 
 Sabine Sun
 Colette Gérard
 Antonio Passalia
 Stéphane
 François de Lannurien
 Gérard Lartigau as Tommy Sturges
 Fredy Meier
 Claude Chabrol as Un liftier (uncredited)

Production

Filming locations
 Eiffel Tower, Paris, France
 Paris, France
 Paris-Orly Airport, Paris, France
 Nice, France
 Nice Côte d'Azur Airport, Nice, France

Soundtrack
The music for The Scarlet Lady was composed by Michel Colombier. A soundtrack EP was released in 1969 on the Barclay label (Barclay 71 351).

Track listing
 "Just Keep On Walking" (Marnay, Jackson, Colombier) – 3:46
 "Wonderful, Wonderful, chanté par Freddy Meyer" (Marnay, Jackson, Colombier) – 1:41
 "Dream" (Colombier) – 4:30

References
Notes

Citations

External links
 
 
 

1969 films
1969 comedy-drama films
Films about suicide
Films directed by Jean Valère
Films set in France
Films set in Paris
French comedy-drama films
1960s French-language films
Italian comedy-drama films
Films with screenplays by Paul Gégauff
1960s Italian films
1960s French films